Parkstone  is an area of Poole, Dorset. It is divided into 'Lower' and 'Upper' Parkstone. Upper Parkstone - "Up-on-'ill" as it used to be known in local parlance - is so-called because it is largely on higher ground slightly to the north of the lower-lying area of Lower Parkstone - "The Village" - which includes areas adjacent to Poole Harbour.

Because of the proximity to the shoreline, and the more residential nature of Lower Parkstone, it is the more sought-after district, and originally included Lilliput and the Sandbanks Peninsula (now part of Canford Cliffs) within its official bounds. Lower Parkstone is centred on Ashley Cross, the original location of Parkstone Grammar School, near to the Parish Church of St. Peter. Despite the residential reputation, Parkstone was the site of several industrial undertakings, the largest being  George Jennings South Western Pottery, a manufacturer of salt-glaze drainage and sanitary pipes, which had its own steam locomotive, that ran on a private branch line from Parkstone Station. Much of this area was agricultural until the 1920s and 1930s.

Upper Parkstone includes large areas of smaller artisan housing, the shopping district along Ashley Road and the parish church of St. John's, Heatherlands. There are larger properties, however, and the views from this higher part of the suburb across Poole Harbour to the Purbeck Hills are quite remarkable. Many photographs taken over the years from the Seaview viewpoint (overlooking much of Poole centre and Harbour) exist as postcards, and can be used to chart the changes to the area.

Parkstone is just south of Alder Hills.

Parkstone Bay is in the far west.

History 
The "Upper Parkstone Estate" was a significant area of land vested in the local authority by the Great Canford Award of 1831, but it was slow to develop into the bustling neighbourhood of today.

In January 1885 we find the earliest indication that a plot of land amounting to 6 acres 2 rods and 35 poles (approximately 25,000 square metres or 2.5 hectares) was to be set aside as a public open space in plans presented to the Council as a result of an invitation to a number of local architects for proposals laying out the Estate.  But what is now known as "Alexandra Park" is essentially Edwardian in concept, having evolved over a period of some 30 years (1885 - 1915).  The name dates from June 1906, the presumption being that it is named after Queen Alexandra, consort of the reigning Edward VII.

Much of Upper Parkstone was developed during the Victorian era and is typical for a development of that period, most of the main shops being situated along a main road (Ashley Road) together with a few pubs and churches, and most houses being in adjacent roads. A lot of roads are named after important people or events of their time such as Albert Road, Victoria Road and Jubilee Road etc.

The area expanded into other areas such as Rossmore and later Alderney, which are sometimes considered to be part of Parkstone. Although most houses in the district are owner-occupied, council houses were also built in the 1930s, 1940s and 1950s. The Trinidad and Bourne Estates are typical examples of post-war housing estates although there are very few council flats in Parkstone as much of the area retains its suburban character.

As of 2012, Ashley Road continues to be principally made up of commercial premises. Though some small blocks of flats have been built along this thoroughfare over the last 20 years, surrounding areas such as Rossmore have changed little during that time. A few older cottage-style dwellings can still be found as reminders of when the area was agricultural, including several pairs of 'Lady Wimborne' houses: yellow-brick cottages with steep gables built by the Canford Estate, whose lands stretched from Longham to Lilliput.

Ashley Road is the main 'corridor' between Bournemouth and Poole and benefits from much through business. As to larger commercial sites along this road, Waitrose moved into the former Safeway and Morrisons site at 311-313 Ashley Road in 2006, abandoning its smaller Westbourne store.

In Lower Parkstone, Ashley Cross retains much character from being a village despite commercial buildings moving out from Poole town centre. Commercial Road is the main thoroughfare here, providing another through route - and bus route - from Poole to Bournemouth. The station is in Lower Parkstone, near Parkstone Park.

Education

Parkstone has a large number of schools for all ages. The North Road and Constitution Hill campuses of The Bournemouth and Poole College also have Parkstone addresses.

In Lower Parkstone the schools are:
Courthill Infant School and Lilliput Infant School feeding into Baden Powell and St Peter's Junior School; pupils then go on to Poole High School, Poole Grammar School or Parkstone Grammar School

In Upper Parkstone the schools are:
Sylvan Infant School which feeds into Branksome Heath Junior School.
Bishop Aldhelm's Primary School, Manorside Primary School, Talbot Primary School and Branksome Heath Junior School which all feed into St Aldhelm's Academy.
St Joseph's Primary School is a Roman Catholic school which feeds into St Edward's School, Poole.
Winchelsea Special School is next to Manorside in Alderney and The Victoria School for children with disabilities is in Branksome.

In Upper Parkstone the schools that have now closed are:
Trinidad First School for children aged 4–8 years old who progressed to Alderney Middle School. The school opened in 1952 to replace Martin Road School and merged with Alderney in 2004 to become Manorside Combined School. The first school moved to the Alderney site and the old school site was redeveloped as housing. Heatherlands was once a full Primary School with an Infant and Junior Section, but was reorganised in the 1980s, closing the Junior section.

Private school
 Bournemouth Collegiate Preparatory School

Areas of Parkstone 
The following estates and districts are often categorised as part of Parkstone, in local trade directories, for instance:
Alderney
Ashley Cross
Heatherlands
Lilliput
Newtown
Penn Hill
Rossmore
Sea View
Whitecliff

Railways
Served by Parkstone railway station on the South West Main Line between Weymouth and London Waterloo.  Until 1966 it was also served by the Somerset and Dorset Joint Railway to Bath.

References

Notes

Bibliography

External links

Areas of Poole
Poole Harbour